Sandford St Martin is a village and civil parish in West Oxfordshire about  east of Chipping Norton and about  south of Banbury. The 2011 Census recorded the parish's population as 209.

Geography
It northern boundary is the B4031 road linking Swerford Heath and Deddington. It is bounded in the south by a field boundary just south of the B4030 road linking Enstone and Westcott Barton. Streams form parts of the eastern boundary. The remainder of the parish is bounded by field boundaries.

Sandford St Martin village is in the south of the parish around a former ford across Tyte brook, a tributary of the River Dorn. In the north of the parish is Grove Ash, which is the site of a deserted Medieval village that used to be a separate township.

History
The village was called Sandford until about 1884, when the suffix "St Martin" was added to distinguish it from Sandford-on-Thames elsewhere in Oxfordshire and Dry Sandford in what was then the neighbouring part of Berkshire.  The centre of the village is a small triangular green, on which is a stone cross. The base is Medieval. The shaft probably dates from a restoration in 1856 by the Gothic Revival architect GE Street. The head is 20th-century.  Sandford's current manor house was built about 1715, but it may include parts of an earlier house.

Opposite the parish church is Sandford Park, which was built about 1700 and has a later 18th-century west wing. A north wing was added in the early 20th century and demolished in 1954. The house is a Grade II* listed building.  In the 18th and 19th centuries there was a pub in Sandford near the Manor House. In 1774 it was licensed as the Silver Tavern. It was briefly renamed the Taylor's Arms, and from 1788 was called the Crown. It ceased trading early in the 1880s and was converted to a residential property, allegedly because Edward Marshall, then occupant of the Manor House, objected to it being so near his home.

Parish church
The earliest parts of the Church of England parish church of St Martin include the north arcade, which has octagonal columns and three bays. The chancel may have been completed in 1273, which was when the church was redecorated. The south door and vaulted porch are Decorated Gothic. Later in the Middle Ages Perpendicular Gothic features were added, notably the clerestory of the nave and the embattled west tower. On the east side of the chancel arch is a painting of the arms of Queen Elizabeth I on a panel of wood.  The church was restored in 1856 to designs by GE Street, who had the chancel rebuilt. One window in the church has stained glass made in 1974 by John Piper and Patrick Reyntiens to symbolise the Legend of Martin's cloak. St Martin's is a Grade II* listed building.

The west tower has a ring of six bells. Nathaniel Bolter and Humphrey Keene of Buckingham cast the third and fourth bells in 1629. James Keene of Bedford, who had a foundry at Woodstock, cast the second and tenor bells in 1630. Mears and Stainbank of the Whitechapel Bell Foundry cast the treble and fifth bells in 1871. The church also has a Sanctus bell that Richard Keene of Woodstock cast in 1695.  The parish is part of the Barton  Benefice, which was formed in March 2015 by the amalgamation of the benefice of Over Worton and Nether Worton with that of Westcott Barton, Steeple Barton, Duns Tew and Sandford St Martin.

Notable people
Henry Scott, 1st Earl of Deloraine KB and the Countess of Deloraine, who are buried at St Martin's parish church.

References

Bibliography

External links

Sandford St Martin & Ledwell

Civil parishes in Oxfordshire
Villages in Oxfordshire
West Oxfordshire District